"Mansion Musik" is a song by American rapper Trippie Redd. It was released on January 20, 2023, as the first track on his fifth studio album Mansion Musik  (2023).

Background
On Augsut 24, 2022, Redd previewed the song on his social media profiles. It later leaked in early January 2023 and a couple of days later a version with a verse from Playboi Carti leaked.

Credits and personnel
 Trippie Redd – vocals, songwriting
 Bosley – production, songwriting
 Naddot – production, songwriting
 Bacon and Popcorn – production, songwriting
 Matt Spatola – production, songwriting
 Igor Mamet – mastering, mixing, recording, production

Charts

References

External links
 

2023 songs
Trippie Redd songs
Songs written by Trippie Redd